Giuseppe Sperduti (Giuliano di Roma 1912 – Rome 1993) was an Italian jurist.

Life
Professor of International law at University of Pisa, he served on the European Commission of Human Rights from  1960 to 1992.

References

1912 births
1993 deaths
People from Frosinone
20th-century Italian jurists
Members of the European Commission of Human Rights
Italian judges of international courts and tribunals